Xylophanes undata is a moth of the  family Sphingidae.

Distribution 
It is found from Central America to Peru and further south into Bolivia.

Description 
The wingspan is 72–83 mm. It is similar in colour and pattern to Xylophanes zurcheri, but the forewing outer margin is more strongly crenulated, the crenulations are all of similar size except for one which is slightly longer. Furthermore, the most distal postmedian line on the forewing upperside is more conspicuous and straight and delineating a narrow, rectangular, pale purple-grey patch.

Biology 
Adults have been recorded year round (except March) in Costa Rica. In Peru, there are three generations per year with adults on wing from January to February, in June and in October.

The larvae probably feed on Rubiaceae species.

References

undata
Moths described in 1903